Whitewater High School is a high school located in the city of Whitewater, Wisconsin, United States. It is a part of the Whitewater Unified School District. It serves students from the city and town of Whitewater and portions of the nearby communities of Richmond, La Grange, Cold Spring, Koshkonong, Lima and Johnstown in Walworth, Jefferson and Rock counties.

Notable alumni 
 Stephen E. Ambrose; historian, author, and founder of National World War II Museum
Ben Heller, MLB pitcher for the New York Yankees
 Greg Kent; NFL player
 Dale Markham; NFL player

References

External links 
 Whitewater High School Homepage

Schools in Walworth County, Wisconsin
Public high schools in Wisconsin
Whitewater, Wisconsin